Samuel Partridge (November 29, 1790 – March 30, 1883) was an American politician who served as a U.S. Representative from New York from 1841 to 1843.

Biography 
Born in Norwich, Vermont, Partridge received a limited schooling.
During the War of 1812 enlisted as a private in the Vermont Militia.
Later appointed a captain of Engineers in the Regular Army.
He served two terms as high sheriff of Windsor County.
He moved to New York and engaged in mercantile pursuits at Cold Spring in 1820.
He moved to Chemung County, New York, in 1830 and to Elmira in 1837 and again engaged in mercantile pursuits.

Congress 
Partridge was elected as a Democrat to the Twenty-seventh Congress (March 4, 1841 – March 3, 1843).

Later career and death 
He engaged in agricultural pursuits and the real estate business.
He died in Elmira, New York, March 30, 1883.
He was interred in Second Street Cemetery.

Sources

1790 births
1883 deaths
United States Army officers
Democratic Party members of the United States House of Representatives from New York (state)
19th-century American politicians